Austin Adams may refer to:

Austin Adams (lawyer) (1826–1890), American lawyer and justice of the Iowa Supreme Court
Austin Adams (baseball, born 1986), American baseball pitcher for the Minnesota Twins
Austin Adams (baseball, born 1991), American baseball pitcher for the San Diego Padres